By-elections to the 17th Canadian Parliament were held to elect members of the House of Commons of Canada between the 1930 federal election and the 1935 federal election. The Conservative Party of Canada led a majority government for the 17th Canadian Parliament.

The list includes Ministerial by-elections which occurred due to the requirement that Members of Parliament recontest their seats upon being appointed to Cabinet. These by-elections were almost always uncontested. This requirement was abolished in 1931.

See also
List of federal by-elections in Canada

References

Sources
 Parliament of Canada–Elected in By-Elections 

1934 elections in Canada
1933 elections in Canada
1932 elections in Canada
1931 elections in Canada
1930 elections in Canada
17th